Periploca laevigata is a species of flowering plant in the family Apocynaceae, native to the Canary Islands, the Savage Islands and Cape Verde.

The species was described by William Aiton and was published in Hortus Kewensis in 1789. "Cornicabra" means goat horn.

Subspecies
Periploca laevigata subsp. chevalieri (Browicz) G. Kunkel - found in Cape Verde

Description
The plant is a shrub and can grow up to 2 metres. Its leaves are lanceolate or. Its stems grow up to 15 cm and is about 1 cm thick. Its petals are oblong at the end and has a yellowish-green colour at its ends, inside, it is brown. Its seed pods are long and pointed-like at the ends.

Its chromosome number is 2n = 22.

Distribution
The plant is native to the Canary Islands, the Savage Islands and Cape Verde. In Cape Verde they occur on the islands of Brava, Fogo, Santa Luzia, Santiago, Santo Antão and São Nicolau. Some authors put the Cape Verdean subspecies as separate (as Periploca chevalieri, Browicz).

Gallery

References

External links

Periplocoideae
Flora of the Canary Islands
Flora of Cape Verde
Flora of the Savage Islands
Plants described in 1789